The All-American Black Tourists were a Negro league baseball team. They were organized by Bud Fowler in 1899. The team was remarkable for the fact that the players played in full suits and formal wear.

References
Loverro, Thom. The Encyclopedia of Negro League Baseball. New York:Facts on File, Inc., 2003. .

Negro league baseball teams
Defunct baseball teams in Washington, D.C.
Baseball teams disestablished in 1899
Baseball teams established in 1899